A syllabus (AFI: /ˈsɪl.ə.bəs/; plural: "syllabuses", "syllabi") or specification, is a document that communicates information about an academic course or class and defines expectations and responsibilities. It is generally an overview or summary of the curriculum. A syllabus may be set out by an examination board or prepared by the tutor or instructor who teaches or controls the course. The word is also used more generally for an abstract or programme of knowledge and is best known in this sense as referring to two catalogues of doctrinal positions condemned by the Catholic Church in 1864 and 1907.

Etymology
According to the Oxford English Dictionary, the word syllabus derives from modern Latin  'list', in turn from a misreading of the Greek   (the leather parchment label that gave the title and contents of a document), which first occurred in a 15th-century print of Cicero's letters to Atticus. Earlier Latin dictionaries such as Lewis and Short contain the word , relating it to the non-existent Greek word , which appears to be a mistaken reading of  'syllable'; the newer Oxford Latin Dictionary does not contain this word.

Chambers Dictionary agrees that it derives from the Greek for a book label, but claims that the original Greek was a feminine noun, borrowed by Latin, the misreading coming from an accusative plural Latin .

Modern research

In a 2002 study, Parks and Harris suggest "a syllabus can serve students as a model of professional thinking and writing". They also believe effective learning requires a complex interaction of skills, such as time management, prioritization of tasks, technology use, etc., and that a syllabus can promote the development of these skills.

In 2005, Slattery & Carlson describe the syllabus as a "contract between faculty members and their students, designed to answer student's questions about a course, as well as inform them about what will happen should they fail to meet course expectations". They promote using action verbs (identify, analyze, evaluate) as opposed to passive verbs (learn, recognize, understand) when creating course goals Habanek stresses the importance of the syllabus as a "vehicle for expressing accountability and commitment."

See also

 Bibliography
 Guide to information sources
 Lesson plan
 Syllabus of Errors
 Lamentabili sane exitu

References

Curricula
Educational materials